The Oregon House of Representatives is the lower house of the Oregon Legislative Assembly. There are 60 members of the House, representing 60 districts across the state, each with a population of 65,000. The House meets in the west wing of the Oregon State Capitol in Salem.

Members of the House serve two-year terms without term limits. In 2002, the Oregon Supreme Court struck down Oregon Ballot Measure 3 (1992), that had restricted State Representatives to three terms (six years) on procedural grounds.

In the current legislative session, Democrat Dan Rayfield of Corvallis serves as Speaker.

Milestones
 1914: Marian B. Towne became the first woman elected to the Oregon House
 1972: Bill McCoy became the first African American to serve in the House
 1985: Margaret Carter became the first black woman elected to the House
 1991: Gail Shibley became the first openly gay person to serve in the House
 2013: Tina Kotek became the first openly gay person to serve as Speaker of the House.
 2021: Mike Nearman became the first person to be expelled from the Legislature
 2022: Janelle Bynum became the first Black person to receive votes for Speaker of the House.

Composition
The Republican Party held the majority in the House for many years until the Democratic Party gained a majority following the 2006 elections.
After losing several seats in the 2010 elections, resulting in a split control between both parties for one legislative term, Democrats regained their majority in the 2012 elections. The Oregon State Senate has been under continuous Democratic control since 2005. On June 10, 2021, Republican Mike Nearman was expelled from the house by a 59–1 vote for intentionally letting armed protesters into the Oregon State Capitol to protest against health restrictions related to the COVID-19 pandemic in Oregon. This was the first time a member of the legislature has been expelled in the state's history.

82nd House

Past composition of the House of Representatives

Officers

Speaker

Majority Leader

Minority Leader

Chief Clerk 
"The Chief Clerk of the House is the administrative officer elected for a two-year term by the membership of the House of Representatives to be responsible for ensuring that the chamber's business and proceedings run smoothly. The Chief Clerk's Office is therefore responsible for a multiplicity of duties including the processing of the official business of the House, providing the proper setting for consideration and enactment of Oregon laws, maintaining the Rules of the House of Representatives, and advising presiding officers and other members on the proper interpretation of chamber rules and protocols." 

The Office of the Chief Clerk also comprises a Deputy Chief Clerk, Journal Clerk, Measure History Clerk, Reading Clerk, and a Seargeant-at-Arms.

See also
List of speakers of the Oregon House of Representatives
Oregon State Capitol
Oregon Legislative Assembly
Oregon State Senate

Notes

References

External links
Oregon House of Representatives
Map of House Districts
Lists of legislators and legislative staff going back to pre-statehood Oregon

State lower houses in the United States
 
House
1859 establishments in Oregon